Russell Devlin Turner (born October 24, 1970) is an American college basketball coach who is the head men's coach at UC Irvine, a position he has held since 2010.

Playing career
As a player at Hampden-Sydney College in Virginia, Turner was the all-time leading scorer in Hampden-Sydney basketball history, tallying 2,272 points, and was the only player ever to score over 2,000 points. Turner holds the Hampden-Sydney record for points in a season (680) and average points in his career (21.6). He earned First Team All-ODAC four times (1989, 1990, 1991, 1992) and was a three-time All-South Region performer (1990, 1991, 1992). Turner also earned ODAC All-Tournament honors three times (1989, 1991, 1992). Turner was a two-time All-American, earning the honor in 1991 and 1992. Solid in the classroom as well, Turner earned First Team Academic All-American honors in 1992.

Coaching career
As the head coach at UC Irvine, Turner led the Anteaters to the second round of the 2013 CollegeInsider.com Postseason Tournament, the program's first postseason win since 2002.  UC Irvine also reached the Big West Conference tournament final and won the third most single-season games in UC Irvine history with 21 in the 2012–13 season.  The Anteaters went a perfect 9–0 in home Big West games and 13–1 overall in home contests.  UCI was also ranked first in the Big West and 15th in the nation in field-goal percentage defense at .387.  In 2014, UCI earned the regular season conference championship and secured a berth in the 2014 NIT  where they lost to top seeded SMU. That year Turner was named the Big West Coach of the Year and also the 2014 NABC District 9 Coach of the year.  In 2015, in his third consecutive 20+ win season, Turner let the Anteaters of UCI to the first NCAA tournament in school history where they narrowly lost to Louisville who later made it to the Sweet 16.  In 2016, in a school record fourth consecutive 20+ win season, Turner's team broke the school record for season wins previously set at 25 with 28 victories and were runners-up in the 2016 CollegeInsider.com Postseason Tournament falling to Colombia in the Championship Game. In 2017, Turner was again named Big West Coach of the Year after his Anteaters clinched the regular season championship and a 5th straight 20+ win season. In 2019, Turner was named Big West Coach of the Year for a third time in six years and coached his team to a fourth regular season conference championship in the previous six years and sixth 20+ win season in the previous 7 years. His 2019 team ranks 1st in the nation in 2pt FG defense, and 5th overall in FG defense for Division I teams, are tied with Stony Brook for the best road game record at 13-2, and boasted an undefeated road game record in the Big West.

Turner was formerly an assistant coach for the Golden State Warriors of the NBA, serving under head coach Mike Montgomery and then for head coach Don Nelson.  For Golden State, Turner has worked closely with players on individual skill development. Turner also served as a coach for the Warriors summer league entry in Las Vegas for five consecutive years. Additionally, he coached at the NBA/Haier Camp in China. Prior to that, he served as a coach at the NBA's Basketball Without Borders camp in Lithuania in 2006.

Before the NBA, Turner spent 11 seasons as a collegiate assistant coach, working in two highly successful programs. In four seasons at Stanford University from 2000–01 to 2003–04, Turner helped the Cardinal amass a 74–21 record (.779), two Pac-10 Championships and advance to three-straight NCAA Tournaments. Stanford was ranked #1 in the country twice during Turner's time on "The Farm," reaching the top spot in the AP poll in both 2000–01 and 2003–04. Before joining the staff at Stanford, he served six seasons as an assistant coach at Wake Forest University from 1994 to 2000.

During his time at Wake Forest, the Deacons won a pair of ACC Championships and an NIT title, while reaching post-season play in all six seasons. Before Wake Forest, Turner worked for one season (1993–94) as an assistant coach at his alma mater, Hampden–Sydney College, prior to joining the staff at Wake Forest. That season, the team finished 22–8 and reached the Division III NCAA Tournament Sweet Sixteen for just the second time in school history.  Throughout his years as a collegiate assistant, Turner helped coach several future NBA players, including Tim Duncan, Josh Howard, Darius Songaila, Casey Jacobsen, Jarron Collins, Jason Collins and Josh Childress.

Personal life
A native of Roanoke, Virginia, where he attended Patrick Henry High School, Turner graduated from Hampden–Sydney College with magna cum laude honors and a B.A. in English and Economics. Turner was inducted into Phi Beta Kappa for his academic success.

Turner and his wife Liz, also a Roanoke native and a Kaiser Permanente critical care physician who trained at Wake Forest University (Masters/MD),UCSF, and Stanford, have two children, daughter Devlin and son Darius.

Accolades
In 2014, Turner was listed by CBS Sports as one of the 10 coaches on the rise in college basketball. In 2015, ESPN Insider listed Turner as one of the 10 coaches to watch. Turner was voted one of the Top 100 Most Influential People in Orange County in 2015. He was also a finalist for the Skip Prosser Man of the Year Award in 2017 and 2020, and a finalist for the Hugh Durham National Coach of the Year Award in 2019 and 2020.

Head coaching record

References

External links
UC Irvine profile
NBA profile
Stanford profile
Wake Forest profile

1970 births
Living people
American men's basketball coaches
American men's basketball players
Basketball coaches from Virginia
Basketball players from Virginia
College men's basketball head coaches in the United States
Golden State Warriors assistant coaches
Hampden–Sydney Tigers basketball coaches
Hampden–Sydney Tigers basketball players
Place of birth missing (living people)
Sportspeople from Roanoke, Virginia
Stanford Cardinal men's basketball coaches
UC Irvine Anteaters men's basketball coaches
Wake Forest Demon Deacons men's basketball coaches